Secrets of the Mountain is the first TV film in Family Movie Night, a series of commercial made-for-TV movies produced by Procter & Gamble and Walmart aimed at families. Movies in the series feature embedded marketing of the producers' products. P&G Productions supposedly budgeted $4.5 million to make the TV film.

Plot
A mountain cabin is inherited by a single mother and her three children from an eccentric uncle. The story's theme was that a family needs to pull together in tough times to move ahead.

Cast 
 Paige Turco: Dana James
 Barry Bostwick: Henry Beecham
 Shawn Christian: Tom Kent
 Adelaide Kane: Jade Ann James
 Crawford Wilson: Jake James
 Kayla Carlson: Maddie James
 Andreas Apergis: Nigel Fowler
 Frank Schorpion: Colin James
 Allison Graham: Brandi James

History
Dante Amodeo of Jacksonville Beach was approached at a book signing for his young adult mystery novel, Saban and the Ancient (2006) by a local TV producer for family friendly scripts. Amodeo developed a story he called "The Mountain". The story then tested so well the Family Movie Night partners purchased the idea. Amodeo then wrote the screenplay before it was handed off to Douglas Barr to finalize the story. Barr was also hired to direct the film. P&G Productions supposedly budgeted $4.5 million to make the TV film. Production took place in Montreal with a 100-foot "mountain" built on a football field-size sound stage. By February 1, 2010, NBC had scheduled the telefilm for April 16, 2010 while also indicating that it was a back door pilot.

See also
 The Jensen Project
 Product placement

References

External links
  at archive.org
 

Walmart
Television films as pilots
American television films
2010 television films
2010 films
Films directed by Douglas Barr